Uis is a settlement located in Erongo Region, Namibia. It belongs to the Dâures electoral constituency. Located in the former Damaraland, it is known for the local mineral wealth. The settlement was established in 1958 as workers' settlement to exploit local tin deposits. It has approximately 3,600 inhabitants and, before being downgraded from "village" to "settlement" in 2010, owned  of land.

Uis is located at the foot of the Brandberg, Namibia's highest mountain. The Brandberg is home to the world famous The White Lady rock painting, said by some to be over 20,000 years old. Being also situated on the C36, the main road between the coast and the Damaraland interior there is reasonable amount of traffic, by far the main source of economic activity in Uis. The settlement holds a small supermarket, guesthouses and a restcamp, a bakery and a petrol station, together with a few other small shops. The ephemeral Uis River, a tributary to the Ugab River, passes the settlement.

Uis is home to the Brandberg Primary School and Petrus ǃGaneb Secondary School, both for about 300 learners. Petrus Ganeb SS was built before Namibian independence; its facilities are old and dilapidated.

Uis mine
Tin has been mined in the Uis region since 1922. Uis Tin Mining Company was established in 1951 and a settlement was developed in 1958 as a mine workers' residence when ISCOR, a South African mining company, started operations there and increased production. However, the ore grade at Uis is very low, and the mine, at its time the largest open-cast tin mine in the world, was viable only because South Africa, to which the territory was mandated, was economically isolated and could not buy tin on the world market. When apartheid was abolished and international sanctions were lifted the mine was no longer competitive. In 1991, the main mining operation closed down because the price of tin dropped far enough to make it un-economical.

There was still minimal work progressing on the mine site. Technology had improved enough to make it worthwhile to re-process the already excavated ore that was originally discarded and there is a tiny re-processing plant located near the old mine dumps. This ore is processed to an enriched state and then taken to Walvis Bay for export. In the 2010s investments and work started again at the old mine; Today successful production is dependent on a high world market price.

The mine and the surrounding settlement are situated on the farm Uis Townlands No. 215 and today in private hands. The white mine spoils are visible from afar. Since 1995 Namib Base Minerals Pty Ltd is the owner, after a subsidiary of ISCOR sold it.

Uis still produces rare rocks and minerals. Namibia is well known as a mineral rich country and geologists come from all over the world to study in Namibia because much of the interesting geology and rare rocks are situated at ground level rather than on top of mountains or deep underground.

Uis is in danger of becoming a ghost town if mining cannot be continued. Uis was downgraded to "settlement" status in 2010.

References

Mining in Namibia
Populated places in the Erongo Region
Populated places established in 1958
1958 establishments in South West Africa